Xylotoles lynceus is a species of beetle in the family Cerambycidae. It was described by Johan Christian Fabricius in 1775, originally under the genus Saperda. It is known from New Zealand.

References

Dorcadiini
Beetles described in 1775
Taxa named by Johan Christian Fabricius